0S (zero S) or 0-S may refer to:

 0s, the period from January 1, AD 1 to December 31, AD 9, almost synonymous with the 1st decade (1–10).
 The period from January 1, AD 1 to December 31, AD 99, almost synonymous with the 1st century (1–100). 
 The period from January 1, AD 1 to December 31, AD 999, almost synonymous with the 1st millennium (1–1000). 
 0S, 0°S, or zero degrees south, coordinate for the equator
 Zero S, a model of electric motorcycle
 0 set, or zero set, a concept in mathematics
 0 sum, or zero-sum, a theory in games and economics
 0 sharp, also zero sharp or 0#, a concept in set theory
 0 section, or zero section, a type of section in a Vector bundle

See also
 0s (disambiguation)
 OS (disambiguation)
 S0 (disambiguation)